Scorpaenopsis eschmeyeri is a species of venomous marine ray-finned fish belonging to the family Scorpaenidae, the scorpionfishes. This species is found in the Southwestern Pacific from Fiji to New Caledonia.

Etymology
The fish is named for William N. Eschmeyer, in recognition of his research on the fishes of the family Scorpaenidae.

Size

References

eschmeyeri
Taxa named by John Ernest Randall
Taxa named by David Wayne Greenfield
Fish described in 2004